The Chief of the Oakland Police Department is an office held by the executive head and highest-ranking officer of the Oakland Police Department. The chief was first established in 1853. The chief manages and oversees the planning, development and implementation of all law enforcement and crime prevention programs for the City. She provides leadership, vision and direction to the Department and its command staff and promotes collaboration, communication and coordination with other city agencies and community organizations.

Sean Whent became police chief in May 2014. He became interim chief in May 2013, replacing interim chief Anthony Toribio, who served for only two days after chief Howard Jordan left for uncited medical reasons.  Howard was preceded by Anthony Batts.

Whent spent two decades on the force, joining in 1996. Oakland PD monitor Robert Warshaw forced Whent to resign due to the role of Whent (and his wife) in the coverup of a sexual-misconduct scandal involving Oakland police officers (as well as personnel from multiple other agencies) and a child sex trafficking victim.

Mayor Libby Schaaf appointed City Administrator Sabrina Landreth as head of the department on June 17, 2016, putting it under civilian control, after 3 police chiefs resigned within 9 days. The department had been under multiple investigations at the time of the appointment.  On January 4, 2017, Schaaf appointed Anne Kirkpatrick to serve as the next police chief. Kirkpatrick officially assumed office after being sworn in on February 27. On February 15, 2023, Oakland Mayor Sheng Thao announced plans to fire the city's current police chief LeRonne Armstrong.

List of Oakland police chiefs

References

https://abc7news.com/amp/oakland-police-chief-leronne-armstrong-opd-administrative-leave-commission-special-meeting-misconduct-allegations/12819499/

External links
 Chief of Police on Oakland Wiki

Oakland Police Department
Law enforcement workers from California
Oakland